Robert Slipčenko (born August 16, 1985) is a Czech former professional ice hockey goaltender.

Slipčenko played 44 games in the Czech Extraliga for HC Slavia Praha. He previously played for HC Slezan Opava, HC Havířov, HC Kadaň and HC Havlíčkův Brod. and HC Slavia Praha. He also played in the Tipsport Liga for HC '05 Banská Bystrica. HK Poprad and HK Dukla Trenčín and the Polska Hokej Liga for JKH GKS Jastrzębie.

References

External links

1985 births
Living people
HC '05 Banská Bystrica players
HC Berounští Medvědi players
Czech ice hockey goaltenders
HK Dukla Trenčín players
ETC Crimmitschau players
HC Havířov players
BK Havlíčkův Brod players
JKH GKS Jastrzębie players
HC Most players
HK Poprad players
HC Slavia Praha players
Sportovní Klub Kadaň players
HC Stadion Litoměřice players
HC Tábor players
Czech expatriate sportspeople in Latvia
Czech expatriate sportspeople in Poland
Expatriate ice hockey players in Poland
Expatriate ice hockey players in Latvia
Czech expatriate ice hockey players in Slovakia
Czech expatriate ice hockey players in Germany